The Alexandria Canal was a canal in the United States that connected the city of Alexandria to Georgetown in the District of Columbia.

In 1830, merchants from Alexandria (which at the time was within the jurisdiction of the federal District of Columbia) proposed linking their city to Georgetown to capitalize on the new Chesapeake and Ohio Canal (C&O Canal). Congress granted a charter to the Alexandria Canal Company in 1830. Construction began in 1833 and was completed in 1843.

The Aqueduct Bridge (also begun in 1833 and completed in 1843) enabled canal boats from the C&O Canal to cross the Potomac River without descending to the river level.  The boats would then continue their trips downstream on a canal on the southwest side of the Potomac until they reached Alexandria's seaport.

The canal ran southwards for seven miles through today's Arlington County and City of Alexandria, Virginia, dropping 38 feet through a series of four locks between Washington Street and the Potomac River in the northern portion of Alexandria. The Canal ended at a Tidal Basin (Pool No. 1) and a Tidal Lock (Lift Lock No. 1) located at the north end of Old Town Alexandria.

The canal was abandoned in 1886.  Ten years after the canal closed, an electric trolley line was constructed in 1896 in Arlington on the bed of the towpath that traveled near and along the canal's west side (see: Washington-Mount Vernon line of the Washington, Alexandria, and Mount Vernon Electric Railway). Arlington's South Eads Street now approximates the canal's route in this area.

Also in 1896, the Washington Southern Railway opened a line that traveled between the southern end of the Long Bridge and the southern end of the Aqueduct Bridge. The line, which passed the present site of The Pentagon, traveled within the grade of the former canal in the area that lies between Arlington National Cemetery and the Potomac River. The line became in 1904 the Rosslyn Connecting Railroad, which the Pennsylvania Railroad owned through a subsidiary, the Philadelphia, Baltimore and Washington Railroad (PB&W).

The Rosslyn Connecting Railroad abandoned nearly all of its line in 1962 and closed in 1969. The Washington Metropolitan Area Transit Authority then constructed an open section of Metrorail's Blue Line along a portion of the railroad's route that had traveled within the canal's grade. The section of the Blue Line opened on July 1, 1977.

After the Key Bridge was completed in 1923, the old superstructure of the Aqueduct Bridge was removed.  During the 1980s, Alexandria City archaeologists and the developer of the neighboring Trans-Potomac Canal Center excavated the Tidal Basin and Lock and covered the original remnants with a reconstruction. Aside from these two features, the abutments of the Aqueduct Bridge in Georgetown and Rosslyn, and a pier of the bridge in the Potomac River upstream of the Key Bridge, all of the canal's remnants have either been removed or remain underground.

Notes

References
 
 .
 .

External links

 Maps and aerial photos
 Aqueduct Bridge abutment, Georgetown: Hybrid satellite image/map from WikiMapia
 Aqueduct Bridge pier, Potomac River: Hybrid satellite image/street map from WikiMapia
 Aqueduct Bridge abutment, Rosslyn: Hybrid satellite image/street map from WikiMapia
 Metrorail Blue Line on former Alexandria Canal route, Arlington: Hybrid satellite image/street map from WikiMapia
 S. Eads Street on former Alexandria Canal route, Arlington: Hybrid satellite image/street map from WikiMapia 
 Restored Tidal Basin and Lock of Alexandria Canal, Alexandria: Hybrid satellite image/street map from WikiMapia
 

Locks on the National Register of Historic Places in Virginia
Transportation in Alexandria, Virginia
Transportation in Arlington County, Virginia
Water transportation in Washington, D.C.
History of the District of Columbia
Canals in Virginia
National Register of Historic Places in Alexandria, Virginia
Canals opened in 1833
Canals in Washington, D.C.
1833 establishments in Virginia